Wellingborough School is a co-educational day independent school in the market town of Wellingborough in Northamptonshire. It was established in 1595 and is one of the oldest schools in the country. Well known alumni include:

A

 Anna Turney

B

C
Richard Coles
Will Chudley

D
Dickie Dodds
James Dyson

E
Michael Ellis (British politician)

F

G
 W Stephen Gilbert (television dramatist, critic)
David Gillett
Sir William Gilliatt
Christopher Greenwood

H
Nick Haste, first-class cricketer
Wyndham Hazelton
Arthur Henfrey
Peter Hudson (British Army officer)
Maxwell Hutchinson

J
Peter Stanley James
Zain Janjua

L
Andrew Lauder (music executive)
Roger Levitt - disgraced financial adviser, who was banned from the financial services industry for life in 1994.

M
Colin McAlpin
Philip Meeson, Executive Chairman of Dart Group
Rob Milligan
Alison Mitchell

N
Robert Edwin Newbery

O
Andrew Loog Oldham

P
Anne Panter
Richard Peck, British Army major-general and first-class cricketer

R
Dan Roan (journalist)

S
Sirajuddin of Perlis
Dennis Stokes (cricketer)

T
James Brian Tait
George Thompson (cricketer)

V
Bernard Vann

W
Alex Waller
Ethan Waller (Rugby)
Ray Whitney (politician)
David Wilson-Johnson
Henry Winslow Woollett
Ronald Wright (cricketer)

Y

Hamza Yassin

References

People educated at Wellingborough School